Sherlock Holmes was a series of adaptations of Arthur Conan Doyle's Sherlock Holmes stories which were produced by Granada Television and originally broadcast by ITV in the United Kingdom in 1984–1994. The series starred Jeremy Brett as Holmes and David Burke (in the Adventures series) and later Edward Hardwicke as Dr. Watson.

Series overview
The programme adapted 41 of the original stories, with 36 running for 50 minutes (in a one-hour timeslot), and five being feature-length specials.

Episodes

The Adventures of Sherlock Holmes

The Return of Sherlock Holmes

The Case-Book of Sherlock Holmes

The Memoirs of Sherlock Holmes

Notes

References

External links

 

Lists of British crime television series episodes
Lists of British period drama television series episodes
Sherlock Holmes lists